Radhika Jha (born 1970) is an Indian novelist who won the French Prix Guerlain award in 2002 for her first novel, Smell.

Early life 
Jha was born in New Delhi in 1970 and grew up in Mumbai. She lived in Tokyo for 6 years and thoroughly immersed herself in all aspects of Japanese culture. She then moved to Beijing and is now based in Athens with her ambassador husband and two children.

Career and Education 
Jha studied anthropology at Amherst College, Massachusetts, did her master's degree in political science at the University of Chicago and lived in Paris as an exchange student. Jha is also a trained Odissi dancer.

Jha started her career as a journalist and worked for Hindustan Times and Business World writing on culture, the environment and the economy. She also worked for the Rajiv Gandhi Foundation, where she started up the Interact project for the education of the children of the victims of terrorism in different parts of India.

Smell was her debut novel published in 1999.

Books
 Smell, Soho Press 1999 
Worldwide publishers include:
Penguin India (original publisher), 
Editions Philippe Picquier France, 
Neri Pozza Italy, 
Arena Holland, 
Soho Press USA, 
Quartet UK, 
Blanvalet/Bertelsmann Germany, 
Natur och Kultur Sweden, 
Dom Quixote Portugal, 
Diigisi Greece, 
Fuso Japan, 
Ediciones el Cobre Spanish, 
Alfa Narodna Knjiga Serbia, 
Leaders Publishers Korea, 
Editura Leda Romania, 
Janet 45 Bulgaria

 The Elephant and the Maruti: Stories, Penguin Books 2003  
Worldwide publishers include:
Penguin India, 
Arena Holland, 
Neri Pozza Italy, 
Editions Philippe Picquier France, 
Dom Quixote Portugal, 
Defne Yayinevi Turkey

 Lanterns on their horns, 2009  
Worldwide publishers include:
HarperCollins India, 
Editions Philippe Picquier France, 
Neri Pozza Italy, 
Beautiful Books UK (rights reverted), 
House of Books Netherlands

 My Beautiful Shadow, HarperCollins 2014  
Worldwide publishers include:
HarperCollins India, 
Editions Philippe Picquier France, 
Sellerio Editore Italy, 
AST Russia, 
Alianza Spain & Latin America, 
Jacaranda Books UK

See also
 List of Indian writers

References 

1970 births
Living people
Indian women novelists
Indian women columnists
Indian columnists
Women writers from Delhi
21st-century Indian novelists
21st-century Indian women writers
Novelists from Delhi